Jacques Zabor (June 28, 1941 – November 22, 2007) was a French actor and comedian. In 1980 he starred in Le Voyage en douce under director Michel Deville.

Filmography

References

External links

1941 births
2007 deaths
French comedians
French male film actors
20th-century French comedians